Curtis Bentley Atchley Jr. (June 30, 1930 – November 14, 2018), known as Ben Atchley, was an American politician in the state of Tennessee. He served in the Tennessee House of Representatives from 1972 to 1976 and the Tennessee State Senate from 1977 to 2005, as a Republican. He was a majority leader and caucus chairman in the senate. He was an alumnus of the University of Tennessee, Knoxville and veteran of the United States Naval Reserve. He was married with two children.

References

1930 births
2018 deaths
Politicians from Knoxville, Tennessee
Military personnel from Tennessee
Republican Party Tennessee state senators
Republican Party members of the Tennessee House of Representatives
University of Tennessee alumni